Talk Is Cheap: Volume 2 is the 12th live spoken word album by Henry Rollins, released January 23, 2003 on 2.13.61 Records. Talk Is Cheap: Volume 1 was recorded the previous night at the Enmore Theater.

Topics
Spazz Mit Microphone
Pauline Hanson
Australia
TV shows: Big Brother, Survivor, "Surviving Henry"
Bill Clinton's impeachment
U.S. Navy submarine commander Scott Waddle - accidentally destroyed a Japanese fishing boat on February 9, 2001 with the USS Greeneville
Happy Birthday
Growing old
Nick Cave
Henry's experience at his first Birthday Party concert in 1983
Early Retirement
Growing old
Shifting from boyhood to manhood; girls into women
It's Kiss!
Henry's experience going to his first Kiss concert in 2000
Henry's Kiss-fanatic bandmates
San Bernardino, CA
The men and women of the Kiss Army
Wal-Mart
Ted Nugent
Playing at a music festival in Germany with Macy Gray
The Wisdom of Gene and Paul
Not burning out as you grow older
Traveling
India
Henry's experience visiting India for the first time
Over-consumption in America & trying to stay low to the ground

Track listing

Disc 1
 "Spazz Mit Microphone" - 12:44
 "Happy Birthday" - 5:52
 "Early Retirement" - 18:44
 "It's Kiss! Pt. 1" - 38:37

Disc 2
 "It's Kiss! Pt. 2" - 29:27
 "The Wisdom of Gene and Paul" - 4:03
 "India" - 6:44

Credits
Randy Fransz - Recording
Rae Di Leo - Mixing
Dave Chapple - Design
Mike Curtis - Tour Management

References

2003 live albums
Henry Rollins live albums
Live spoken word albums
Live comedy albums
Spoken word albums by American artists
2.13.61 live albums